The Parti pour la république du Canada (Québec) (in English: Party for the Commonwealth of Canada (Quebec)) was the Quebec branch of the Party for the Commonwealth of Canada, a Canadian political party formed by supporters of U.S. politician Lyndon LaRouche. Founded in 1983, it contested seats in the 1985, 1989 and 1994 Quebec general elections under various names: Parti républicain du Québec (Republican Party of Quebec; not to be mistaken with the Parti républicain du Québec, a sovereigntist party founded by Marcel Chaput in 1962), Parti pour le Commonwealth du Canada (Québec) and Parti pour la république du Canada (Québec). It also contested by-elections prior to the 1985 general election.

The PRC(Q) was disbanded after the 1994 general election. It now operates as the Committee for the Republic of Canada.

Election results

See also

 Politics of Quebec
 List of Quebec general elections
 List of Quebec premiers
 List of Quebec leaders of the Opposition
 National Assembly of Quebec
 Timeline of Quebec history
 Political parties in Quebec
 North American Labour Party

External links
 Site Officiel
 National Assembly historical information
 La Politique québécoise sur le Web

LaRouche movement
Provincial political parties in Quebec
Political parties established in 1983
Defunct political parties in Canada
1983 establishments in Quebec
Republicanism in Canada